SS Hamburg was a German  ocean liner owned by the Hamburg America Line, built by the Blohm & Voss of Hamburg, Germany, and launched in 1925. She had a sister ship, .

During World War II, the ship became a naval accommodation ship for the Kriegsmarine in 1940 and served with the 7th U-boat Flotilla in Kiel. Reassigned to 3rd U-boat Flotilla on 1 March 1941, Hamburg was transferred to 6th U-boat Flotilla in Danzig in October. From June 1943, Hamburg was relocated to Gotenhafen and assigned to 8th U-boat Flotilla. On 7 March 1945 during the evacuation of Germans from the Eastern Front, she struck a mine and sank off Saßnitz in position .

The wreck was raised by the Soviets and converted to a whaler at Warnowwerft, Warnemünde, from 7 November 1950. Becoming Yuri Dolgoruki, the ship was put in service on 12 July 1960. She was then broken up in 1977.

References

Bibliography

External links
 Hamburg America Line SS Hamburg Ephemera GG Archives

Ships of the Hamburg America Line
Ships sunk by mines
Ocean liners
Ships built in Hamburg
1925 ships